Distretto di Polizia is an Italian television series.

Cast 

Isabella Ferrari:   Giovanna Scalise 
Giorgio Tirabassi:  Roberto Ardenzi 
Ricky Memphis:  Mauro Belli 
Lorenzo Flaherty: Walter Manrico 
Simone Corrente:  Luca Benvenuto 
Serena Bonanno:  Nina Moretti 
Roberto Nobile:  Antonio Parmesan  
Marco Marzocca:  Ugo Lombardi 
Carlotta Natoli:  Angela Rivalta 
Claudia Pandolfi:  Giulia Corsi 
Giorgio Pasotti:  Paolo Libero  
Giampaolo Morelli: Davide Rea  
Giulia Bevilacqua:  Anna Gori 
Francesca Inaudi:  Irene Valli 
Enrico Silvestrin:  Alessandro Berti 
Massimo Dapporto:  Marcello Fontana 
Max Giusti:  Raffaele Marchetti 
Anna Foglietta: Elena Argenti 
Stefano Pesce: Lorenzo Monti 
Flavio Parenti:  Gabriele Mancini 
Dino Abbrescia: Pietro Esposito 
Lucilla Agosti:  Barbara Rostagno  
Andrea Renzi: Leonardo Brandi

Episodes

Season 1 (2000)

Season 2 (2001)

Season 3 (2002)

Season 4 (2003)

Season 5 (2005)

Season 6 (2006)

Season 7 (2007)

Season 8 (2008)

Season 9 (2009)

Season 10 (2010)

Season 11 (2011-2012)

See also
List of Italian television series

External links
 

Italian crime television series
2000 Italian television series debuts
2012 Italian television series endings
2000s Italian television series
2010s Italian television series
Canale 5 original programming